Austria competed at the 1900 Summer Olympics in Paris, France.  Austrian and Hungarian results at early Olympics are generally kept separate despite the union of the two nations as Austria-Hungary at the time.

14 Austrian competitors entered 3 disciplines, with 20 entries across 11 events.

Medalists

Results by event

Aquatics

Swimming

Four swimmers represented Austria in 1900. It was the nation's second appearance in the sport.

Athletics

Two Austrian athletes competed in three events, not winning any medals in the sport. It was Austria's first appearance in athletics.

Equestrian

Austria had two riders in 1900, the debut of equestrian at the Olympics.

Fencing

Austria competed for the second time in fencing at the 1900 Games.  The Austrian saberists won a pair of bronze medals, the nation's first medals in the sport.

References

 De Wael, Herman. Herman's Full Olympians: "1900 Olympians from Austria". Accessed 11 March 2006.
 

Nations at the 1900 Summer Olympics
1900
Olympics